Purple Cane Road is a crime novel by  James Lee Burke.

Plot summary
Dave Robicheaux, former officer for the New Orleans Police Department and before that a U.S. Army infantry lieutenant who fought in the Vietnam War, works as sheriff's deputy in New Iberia, Louisiana. In this book, he discovers new evidence in a murder case and additional leads in the disappearance of his mother, a longstanding subplot to this series. 

Publishers Weekly gave it a starred review. Kirkus gave it a positive review. Writing for The New York Times, Richard Bernstein was intrigued by the book but found it, "so devoted to its own appearances, that it comes across as almost a commentary on itself rather than as something real..." A reviewer in the Houston Chronicle stated, "James Lee Burke scores again with great characters."

Release details
 2000, USA, Simon & Schuster, New York,

References

2000 American novels
American detective novels